Dave Hutchison may refer to:

 Dave Hutchison (footballer) (1870–1956), Australian rules footballer
 Dave Hutchison (ice hockey) (born 1952), Canadian ice hockey player
 David Hutchison (born 1976), American football coach and player
 David E. Hutchison (born 1943), former member of the Wisconsin State Assembly
 David William Hutchison (1908–1982), general in the United States Air Force

See also
 David Hutcheson (1905–1976), British actor
 David Hutchinson (disambiguation)
 David MacBrayne shipping company, originally David Hutcheson & Co.